Curonian Kings are a Latvian cultural group, originally lesser vassals and free farmers that lived in seven villages between Goldingen (Kuldīga) and Hasenpoth (Aizpute) in Courland.

History 

It is unclear how Curonian Kings gained their status, however, a popular assumption is that their ancestors were Curonian nobility prior to conquest by Livonian Order. They were first mentioned in a document of 1320 and lived in the villages of Ķoniņciems, Pliķu ciems, Kalējciems, Ziemeļciems, Viesalgciems, Sausgaļciems, and Dragūnciems (now in Kuldīga municipality). All of them possessed independent farms (did not belong to any lord), but they were not allowed to own their own serfs. They had only one landlord komtur of Kuldīga and they were related to him only by military service in case of war. Curonians usually served as a light cavalry in the Livonian Order army. Sources mention that Curonian Kings fought in the Livonian War against invading Russians, as Johann Renner's chronicle reports:

The Russians protected themselves boldly, and they knocked out a Curonian cadet (who, although only a peasant, is called by them the Curonian king) from his horse.

—Johann Renner, Lievländische Historien, 1556–1561, C. 124v

In 1504 master of the Livonian order Walter von Plettenberg awarded Curonian King Andrejs Peniķis, commander of the Curonian light cavalry for his loyal service during Livonian wars with Muscovite Russia.

It is known that in the 17th century Curonian Kings had their own coats of arms. In the Duchy of Courland and Semigallia they gradually lost their privileges, but they were still counted as a separate class. They were not recognized landlords but maintained a middle position between landlords and peasants. However, in the 18th century they were likened to serfs, although with smaller socage duties.

Their status was again recognized in 19th century, although they were not recognized as part of local nobility. In 1860 there were 833 Curonian kings living in Courland Governorate. While the Curonian tribe had long been assimilated by the Latvians, the Curonian Kings preserved a separate identity and traditions. Differences mandated by traditional rights disappeared as legal basis for them was removed by the Latvian Land Reform of 1920.

Traditions 

The Curonian Kings also were allowed to practice some aspects of paganism during the period of Livonian Confederation. Despite formal Christianisation after Livonian Crusade Curonian Kings owned a sacred forest where nobody was allowed to hunt or walk. It is possible that the first mention in written sources of those sacred forests occurs in the record left by the Flemish knight Guillebert de Lannoy in 1414. In 1413–1414 he travelled through Livonia to Novgorod, and has left a short description of a Curonian funeral in his travel notes:

Their christmas traditions were described in a 16th century travel description by Königsberg apothecary Reinhold Lubenau:

Notable Curonian Kings 
 Mārtiņš Peniķis (1874–1964) – Latvian general, commander in chief of Latvian Army from 1928 to 1934.
 Ivars Tontegode (1983) – Latvian film director.
 Jānis Peniķis (1933) – Latvian political scientist.

References

 Free Latvians at 1800
Алфавитный список народов, обитающих в Российской Империи. СПб., 1895 
Meyers Konversations-Lexikon, 4. Auflage von 1888–1890. 
Voyages et ambassades de Messire Guillebert de Lannoy: chevalier de la Toison d'or, seigneur de Santes, Willerval, Tronchiennes, Beaumont et Wahégnies. 1399-1450
https://www.letonika.lv/groups/?title=Kur%C5%A1u%20%C4%B7oni%C5%86i/32332

Social history of Latvia
Historical ethnic groups of Europe
People from Courland
Kuldīga Municipality